Frank Riseley and Sydney Smith defeated Norman Brookes and Alfred Dunlop 6–2, 1–6, 6–2, 6–3 in the All Comers' Final, but the reigning champions Laurence Doherty and Reginald Doherty defeated Riseley and Smith 6–2, 6–4, 6–8, 6–3 in the challenge round to win the gentlemen's doubles tennis title at the 1905 Wimbledon Championships.

Draw

Challenge round

All comers' finals

Top half

Bottom half

References

External links

Men's Doubles
Wimbledon Championship by year – Men's doubles